The Moldova men's national under-20 basketball team is a national basketball team of Moldova, administered by the Basketball Federation of Moldova. It represents the country in men's international under-20 basketball competitions.

FIBA U20 European Championship participations

See also
Moldova men's national basketball team
Moldova men's national under-18 basketball team

References

External links
Archived records of Moldova team participations

Basketball in Moldova
Basketball
Men's national under-20 basketball teams